CBS Home Entertainment (formerly CBS Video Enterprises, Inc., MGM/CBS Home Video, CBS/Fox Video and CBS Video, currently branded as CBS DVD for DVD releases and CBS Blu-ray for Blu-ray releases) is a home entertainment company owned by Paramount Global. Its releases are distributed by Paramount Home Entertainment.

History 
CBS, Inc. established a home video arm, CBS Video Enterprises (CVE), in January 1980 with Cy Leslie as chairman.

In 1980, CVE formed a joint venture with Metro-Goldwyn-Mayer (MGM), called MGM/CBS Home Video which licensed the film library of MGM for release on home videocassette, following the early leads of Paramount Home Video and 20th Century Fox's Magnetic Video division. In addition to the MGM film library, the company released output from CBS News, CBS Records, the CBS television network, CBS Theatrical Films, and the motion picture division of Lorimar.

By 1981, MGM/CBS had expanded from VHS and Betamax to RCA's CED system as well. Also that year, CBS Video Enterprises handled distribution of its five titles by Samuel Goldwyn Home Entertainment in conjunction with MGM/CBS. In 1982, CBS withdrew from the MGM joint venture. The MGM/CBS company reorganized into MGM/UA Home Video.

A short time later, CBS purchased a stake in 20th Century Fox's home video operation, and formed CBS/Fox Video. The new company reissued many of CBS' properties issued under the CBS/Fox label, in addition to films under the 20th Century Fox banner.  Two specialty labels, Key Video, and Playhouse Video, were also created.

The CBS/Fox joint venture was reorganized in 1990, with Key Video and Playhouse Video ceasing operations, and Fox Video was created to release the mainstream output of 20th Century Fox. CBS continued to issue their product and programming under the Fox Video label until 1998, and utilized the CBS/Fox label for BBC Video programs until 1999. In 1999, CBS/Fox Video was folded into 20th Century Fox Home Entertainment (now called 20th Century Studios Home Entertainment, part of Walt Disney Studios Home Entertainment, since 2020).

After the CBS/Viacom merger was completed in 2000, Paramount Home Entertainment became CBS Video/DVD's distributor. Both companies were split again on January 1, 2006, but they were still controlled by National Amusements. CBS Corporation formed CBS Home Entertainment as a new home entertainment arm in 2007. However, CBS and Viacom remerged once again on December 4, 2019, this time into ViacomCBS (now Paramount Global). Paramount continues to distribute a majority of CBS DVDs and Blu-rays, with several exceptions. Sony Pictures Home Entertainment won the right to release material from the newly formed incarnation of CBS Films beginning in 2010, under license from CBS Home Entertainment; five years later, Lionsgate Home Entertainment succeeded Sony Pictures Home Entertainment as CBS Films' home media distributor. Most less-demanded CBS programs are either released on manufactured-on-demand DVDs by CBS itself or licensed to Visual Entertainment Inc.

References

External links 
 Official site

Home video companies of the United States
Paramount Global subsidiaries
Companies based in Los Angeles
Entertainment companies based in California
Entertainment companies established in 1980
Mass media companies established in 1980
1980 establishments in California